The Port of Gennevilliers is the largest port in the Ile-de-France and the largest French river port. It is located in the commune of Gennevilliers in the north of the Hauts-de-Seine.

The port is primarily a commercial port. It is an important delivery terminal for semi-finished non-perishable freight from lower-Seine (via Le Havre), and also for heavy materials carried by the French canal system. These items are mostly heavy, low value-added bulk materials: sand and gravel, cement, finished building materials (such as metal frames), packaging materials (paper, pallets) or certain dangerous chemicals. 

The port is suitable for use by river barges, but accepts more and more container barges carrying finished industrial products (furniture, electric and electronic goods), chemicals, petroleum and heating products, grains and other bulk non-perishable agricultural goods. Modifications are underway to allow the port to accept refrigerated river traffic (such as fishing products and meat and fruit and vegetable processors). The refrigerated section will allow the Marché d'Intérêt National de Rungis to become less dependent on road traffic.

The Port confirms that it supplies 13% of goods in the region.

References 

This article has been translated in part from the French Wikipedia equivalent.

Ports and harbours of France